Cartavio belongs to the district of Santiago de Cao, Ascope Province, in the department of La Libertad in Peru. Its coastal location is north of Lima, at a latitude of 7°53'S and longitude of 79°13W and an altitude of 16m above sea level.  
Sugar cane grows in the area and Cartavio has been home to the Cartavio Sugar Company since 1891. Once the site of rum production for Ron Cartavio (now produced in Perú), currently the sugar mill produces not only sugar but also up to 15 million litres of ethanol per year, which could be used by petroleum companies to replace the lead in petrol and thereby reducing the emissions of air pollutants.

External links
http://www.fallingrain.com/world/PE/13/Cartavio.html
https://web.archive.org/web/20070309060743/http://www.micartavio.com/contenido/principal.html
https://web.archive.org/web/20070509140519/http://www.micartavio.com/conociendo/geografia.html
http://archive.nacla.org/Summaries/V10I3P1-1.html
http://www.unep.org/cpi/briefs/Brief23Feb05.doc
https://web.archive.org/web/20070308110747/http://www.roncartavio.com/english/index_musica.html
http://www.iebenjaminfranklin.com

Populated places in La Libertad Region